Jed Patrick Escalante Mabilog (born September 20, 1965), publicly known as Jed Patrick Mabilog, is a Filipino politician who previously served as the Mayor of Iloilo City from 2010 to 2017.

Early life and education 
Mabilog was born on September 20, 1965, and is the fifth of ten children of Jose Chavez Mabilog and Melchorita Locsin Escalante, former barangay captain of Barangay Tap-oc, Molo, Iloilo City. He studied at Assumption-Iloilo and the University of the Philippines High School Iloilo (UPHSI) for elementary and high school, respectively. In 1986, he graduated from the West Visayas State University (WVSU) with a Bachelor of Science, Major in Biology degree. He then proceeded to take medicine at the same university, but quit after only three years.

Political career 
Mabilog's public service started during his college years when he was elected as chairman of the Kabataang Barangay. His political career started in 2007 when he ran and was elected as Vice Mayor of Iloilo City. In 2010, he won the Iloilo City mayorship against former Justice Secretary Raul Gonzales and served three terms until 2017 when he was accused by the President Rodrigo Duterte of being a drug protector. The allegation was categorically denied by Mabilog. Mabilog flew to Canada on August 30, 2017, after attending a disaster management program in Japan and an urban environment accords forum in Malaysia. However, he hasn't come back since, leaving the office of mayor of Iloilo City vacant. The Ombudsman ordered the dismissal of Mabilog and Vice Mayor Jose Espinosa III was appointed as the new mayor to serve the remainder of Mabilog's third term until 2019.

Personal life 
Mabilog is married to Marivic Griengo-Mabilog and is currently living outside the country with their children, Patricia Mabilog and Jonathan Mabilog. Mabilog is a second cousin of former Senator Franklin Drilon.

Awards, honors and recognition 
In 2014, Mabilog was named as "top 5 best and outstanding mayor in the world" in the 2014 World Mayor awards. He was the only local chief executive from the Philippines to make it to the shortlist of 26 finalists from a total of 121 nominations around the world.

References 

|-

|-

1965 births
Living people
People from Iloilo City
Hiligaynon people
Visayan people
Filipino Roman Catholics
Mayors of Iloilo City